The Liars Club may refer to:

Burlington Liars' Club, and American organisation
Liar's Club, an American game show
Liar's Club (band), and American band
The Liars' Club, a memoir by Mary Karr
"The Liars Club", a song by Coheed and Cambria from their album Vaxis – Act II: A Window of the Waking Mind